The 2012 United States House of Representatives elections in Tennessee was held on Tuesday, November 6, 2012, to elect the nine U.S. representatives from the state of Tennessee, one from each of the state's nine congressional districts. The elections coincided with the elections of other federal and state offices, including a quadrennial presidential election and an election to the U.S. Senate. Primary elections were held on August 2, 2012.

These elections were the first under Tennessee's new congressional map after redistricting was completed by the state government. Following the 2012 elections, no seats changed hands, leaving the Tennessee delegation at a 7-2 Republican majority.

Overview

District 1

The redrawn 1st district will represent Carter, Cocke, Greene, Hamblen, Hancock, Hawkins, Johnson, Sevier, Sullivan, Unicoi, and Washington counties, and parts of Jefferson County. The most populous city in the district is Johnson City, and the district will continue to be anchored by the Tri-Cities area. Republican Phil Roe, who has represented the 1st district since 2009, ran for re-election.

Republican primary

Candidates

Nominee
Phil Roe, incumbent U.S. Representative

Primary results

Democratic primary

Candidates

Nominee
Alan Woodruff, attorney

Primary results

General election

Results

District 2

The redrawn 2nd district will represent Blount, Claiborne, Grainger, Knox, and Loudon counties, and parts of Campbell and Jefferson counties. The most populous city in the district is Knoxville; as before, the district is largely coextensive with that city's metropolitan area. Republican Jimmy Duncan who has represented the 2nd district since 1988 ran for re-election.

Republican primary

Candidates

Nominee
Jimmy Duncan, incumbent U.S. Representative

Eliminated in primary
Nick Ciparro, musician and full-time student
Joseph Leinweber, Jr., U.S. Air Force

Primary results

Democratic primary

Candidates

Nominee
Troy Goodale, professor of Political Science at Tusculum College

Primary results

General election

Results

District 3

The redrawn 3rd district will represent Anderson, Hamilton, McMinn, Monroe, Morgan, Polk, Roane, Scott, and Union counties, and parts of Bradley and Campbell counties.  The most populous city in the district is Chattanooga. Republican Chuck Fleischmann, who has represented the 3rd district since January 2011, ran for re-election.

Republican primary

Candidates

Nominee
Chuck Fleischmann, incumbent U.S. Representative

Eliminated in primary
Ron Bhalla, businessman;
Scottie Mayfield, the president of Mayfield Dairy;
Weston Wamp, the founder of a public relations firm and son of former U.S. Representative Zach Wamp

Withdrawn
Jean Howard-Hill, former professor at the University of Tennessee at Chattanooga and candidate for this seat in 2008 and 2010

Declined
J.B. Bennett, attorney
Savas Kyriakidis, businessman, Command Judge in the U.S. Army and independent candidate for this seat in 2010
Robin Smith, health care consultant and former chair of the Tennessee Republican Party and candidate for this seat in 2010
Tres Wittum, a policy and research analyst for state senator Bo Watson

Primary results

Democratic primary

Candidates

Nominee
Mary Headrick, emergency room and acute care physician

Eliminated in primary
Bill Taylor, businessman,

Declined
Brenda Freeman Short, candidate for this seat in 2010

Primary results

Independents

Candidates
Matthew Deniston, Army Veteran and former Ranger

Withdrawn
Topher Kersting, web designer

Declined
Savas Kyriakidis, businessman, Command Judge in the U.S. Army and independent candidate for this seat in 2010

General election

Results

District 4

The redrawn 4th district represented Bedford, Bledsoe, Franklin, Grundy, Lincoln, Marion, Marshall, Meigs, Moore, Rhea, Rutherford, Sequatchie, and Warren counties, and parts of Bradley, Maury, and Van Buren counties.  The most populous city in the district was Murfreesboro, which had previously anchored the 6th District. Republican Scott DesJarlais who had represented the 4th district since January 2011 ran for re-election.

Republican primary
State senator Bill Ketron, a Murfreesboro resident, had been rumored to be considering a run for the 4th; he was chairman of the redistricting committee and reportedly drew Murfreesboro into the district to facilitate a run. However, on January 22, 2012 he announced he would not run.

Candidates

Nominee
Scott DesJarlais, incumbent U.S. Representative

Eliminated in primary
Shannon Kelley, pilot

Declined
Bill Ketron, state senator
Jim Tracy, state senator

Primary results
DesJarlais won the Republican Party primary on August 2, 2012, with about 76% of the vote, besting his opponent, Shannon Kelley, by 35,057 votes to 10,779 in a preliminary count.

Democratic primary
State senator Eric Stewart announced that he would seek the Democratic nomination to challenge DesJarlais in late 2011. The Democratic Congressional Campaign Committee made his candidacy their top priority in the South in early 2012. Stewart won the Democratic party endorsement.

Candidates

Nominee
Eric Stewart, state senator

Primary results

General election

Campaign
The general election was characterized by a series of controversies involving the incumbent. Stewart agreed to three debates, but DesJarlais told the media that he would not participate. The incumbent was "open to revisiting the question later in the campaign", accusing Stewart of "lack of clarity on the issues" as a reason to avoid debating him.  Stewart responded that DesJarlais was avoiding the voters. The local media were critical of the congressman's stance on the debate issue: the Chattanoogan asked, "Why Won't Desjarlais Debate?" and the Times Free Press called it "No good reason to avoid debates".

In October 2012, DesJarlais silenced two Democratic representatives on the floor of Congress. DesJarlais was Speaker of the House pro tempore, in a pro forma session to prevent "President Barack Obama from making recess appointments without congressional consent". Stewart accused DesJarlais of neglecting the district's farmers by not passing the Farm Bill.

The media reported in mid-October 2012 on DesJarlais divorce of his first wife, Susan, from 2001. During their divorce proceedings, Susan DesJarlais alleged that her ex-husband engaged in "violent and threatening behavior". Court filings revealed that he had an affair with a female patient, and pressured her to have an abortion after she became pregnant. In response to the news, Stewart called him a "pro-life hypocrite", contending that "DesJarlais can't be trusted". The DesJarlais campaign did not challenge the truth of the allegations, but replied that "This is old news...."  Stewart parried in a news conference that:

After all that, DesJarlais "lashed out at Stewart", stating "there was no pregnancy, and no abortion", blaming his opponents and ex-wife for "dredging up details from his past".

After the primary elections, the race had been rated "Likely GOP" by RealClearPolitics.  By July 13 FEC filings, DesJarlais had raised twice as much as Stewart, and had "$591,976 in the bank to Stewart's $152,712". Stewart's aim was to "blanket" the local airways with ads attacking his opponent's vote in favor of Paul Ryan's budget, while the incumbent would tie him to President Barack Obama, who is unpopular in the district.  As of October 7, The Tennessean noted that comparing "money and recent history, DesJarlais has the advantage", due to incumbency, raising twice the funds as Stewart, and the GOP tilt of the district; however, "DesJarlais’ edge is not as large as the ones held by his Republican peers in Tennessee, ... DesJarlais entered the election with low name recognition, and he cannot count on the wave of conservative voters that swept Republican candidates into Congress two years ago."  Both candidates were running as "outsiders".

As of October 12, the Romney/Ryan campaign had removed DesJarlais's endorsement from their website as reported by the Associated Press.  Local political analyst Pat Nolan said that, as of October 10, this probably would be in the news for only a few days, "but it may take longer than that for it to really sink in and for people to understand it".  When it breaks and how much money they have to get their messages across are "key" for them.  By October 14, it had become the "State's most contentious U.S. House battle [that] has everyone talking". As of October 13, analysts stated that Stewart still had an uphill battle finding enough voters to back him.

On the eve of the election, November 5, the Associated Press called for Tennessee's 11 electoral votes to go to "Romney with ease." It also predicted an easy re-election for Senator Bob Corker. However, it noted "Tougher times for GOP Rep. Scott DesJarlais after revelations he once discussed abortion with mistress."

Endorsements

Polling

Predictions

Results
DesJarlais won the election 126,751 to Stewart's 99,823, with 95% of the precincts in.

Aftermath
DailyKos noted that the race was one of the "few outliers" in 2012: "No Democratic challenger did quite so well in quite so red a district." Using regression analysis, Stewart's 44.24% tally was the second best of all Democratic candidates, compared to the 30.92% predicted share he would have gotten, all things being equal.

External links
 Map of new District 4 on Govtrack.com

District 5

The redrawn 5th district will represent Davidson and Dickson counties, and most of Cheatham County. It is based around Nashville, all of which was restored to the district. Previously, a sliver of southwestern Nashville had been in the 7th District. Democrat Jim Cooper has represented the 5th district since 2003, and previously represented the 4th district from 1983 until 1995.

Democratic primary

Candidates

Nominee
Jim Cooper, incumbent U.S. Representative

Primary results

Republican primary

Candidates

Nominee
Brad Staats, businessman and performing artist

Eliminated in primary
Justin Jones
Bob Ries, business owner
John Smith, deputy sheriff
Tracey Tarum, avionics technician

Declined
Beth Harwell, speaker of the Tennessee House of Representatives

Primary results

General election

Endorsements

Results

District 6

The redrawn 6th district will represent Cannon, Clay, Coffee, Cumberland, DeKalb, Fentress, Jackson, Macon, Overton, Pickett, Putnam, Robertson, Smith, Sumner, Trousdale, White, and Wilson counties, and small northern parts of Cheatham and Van Buren counties. The most populous city in the district is Cookeville.  Republican Diane Black who has represented the 6th district since January 2011 ran for re-election.

Republican primary

Candidates

Nominee
Diane Black, incumbent U.S. Representative

Eliminated in primary
Lou Ann Zelenik, business owner and candidate for this seat in 2010

Primary results

General election

Endorsements

Results

District 7

The redrawn 7th district will represent Chester, Decatur, Giles, Hardeman, Hardin, Henderson, Hickman, Houston, Humphreys, Lawrence, Lewis, McNairy, Montgomery, Perry, Stewart, Wayne, and Williamson counties, and parts of Benton and Maury counties. The most populous city in the district is Clarksville.  It is significantly  more compact than its predecessor, which stretched for 200 miles from east to west but was only two miles wide in some areas of the eastern portion. Republican Marsha Blackburn who has represented the 7th district since 2003 ran for re-election.

Republican primary

Candidates

Nominee
Marsha Blackburn, incumbent U.S. Representative

Primary results

Democratic primary

Candidates

Nominee
Credo Amouzouvik, founder and CEO of the Homeffa Foundation(a humanitarian organization for Togo)

Withdrawn
Chris Martin

Primary results

General election

Endorsements

Results

District 8

The redrawn 8th district will represent Carroll, Crockett, Dyer, Fayette, Gibson, Haywood, Henry, Lake, Lauderdale, Madison, Obion, Tipton, and Weakley counties, and parts of Benton and Shelby counties. The most populous city in the district is Jackson. The new district is significantly more Republican than its predecessor; the legislature pushed it further into the heavily Republican Memphis suburbs. Republican Stephen Fincher, who has represented the 8th district since January 2011, ran for re-election.

Republican primary

Candidates

Nominee
Stephen Fincher, incumbent U.S. Representative

Eliminated in primary
Annette Justice

Primary results

Democratic primary

Candidates

Nominee
Timothy Dixon, auto industry manager

Eliminated in primary
John Bradley
Christa Stoscheck

Declined
Roy Herron, state senator and nominee for this seat in 2010

Primary results

General election

Results

District 9

The redrawn 9th district will represent most of Shelby County, and is based around Memphis.  Democrat Steve Cohen, who has represented the 9th district since 2007, ran for re-election.

Democratic primary

Candidates

Nominee
Steve Cohen, incumbent U.S. Representative

Eliminated in primary
Tomeka Hart, Memphis City Schools board member

Withdrawn
Thomas Long, Memphis City Court Clerk

Primary results

Republican primary

Candidates

Nominee
George Flinn, radiologist, radio magnate and candidate for the 8th district in 2010

Eliminated in primary
Charlotte Bergmann, business manager and nominee for this seat in 2010
Ernest Lunati
Rollin Stooksberry

Primary results

General election

Results

References

External links 
 Elections at the Tennessee Secretary of State
 United States House of Representatives elections in Tennessee, 2012 at Ballotpedia
 Tennessee U.S. House from OurCampaigns.com
 Campaign contributions for U.S. Congressional races in Tennessee from OpenSecrets
 Outside spending at the Sunlight Foundation

2012
Tennessee
2012 Tennessee elections